The San Antonio Missionaries were a Texas League and Texas-Southern League
minor league baseball team based in the United States city of San Antonio, Texas that played in 1888 and from 1895 to 1896. The team was one of the first professional baseball teams from San Antonio.

References

Baseball teams established in 1888
Defunct minor league baseball teams
Baseball teams disestablished in 1896
1888 establishments in Texas
1896 disestablishments in the United States
Baseball teams in San Antonio
Defunct baseball teams in Texas
Defunct Texas League teams
Texas-Southern League teams